Soviet submarine B-59 was a Project 641 or Foxtrot-class diesel-electric submarine of the Soviet Navy. It played a key role near Cuba during the Cuban Missile Crisis, when senior officers—out of contact with Moscow and the rest of the world, believing they were under attack and possibly at war—considered firing a T-5 nuclear torpedo at US ships.

Background
On October 1, 1962, the Project 641 [Foxtrot] diesel-electric submarine B-59, as the flagship of a detachment with its sister ships B-4, B-36 and B-130, sailed from its base on the Kola Peninsula to the Caribbean Sea, in support of Soviet arms deliveries to Cuba (an operation known to the Soviets as Anadyr).

However, on October 27, units of the United States Navy – the aircraft carrier USS Randolph and 11 destroyers – detected B-59 near Cuba. US vessels began dropping depth charges of the type used for naval training and containing very little charge, not intended to cause damage. There was no other way to communicate with the submarine; the purpose was to attempt to force it to surface for positive identification. Messages from the US Navy, to communicate the type of depth charges being used, never reached B-59 or, it seems, Soviet naval HQ.

Nuclear launch
B-59 had not been in contact with Moscow for a number of days and, although the submarine's crew had earlier been picking up US civilian radio broadcasts, once they began attempting to hide from pursuers the vessel had to run too deep to monitor any radio traffic, so those on board did not know whether or not war had broken out. The captain of the submarine, Valentin Grigoryevich Savitsky, believing that war had started, wanted to launch the nuclear torpedo.

The three most senior officers on board, Captain Savitsky, the political officer Ivan Semyonovich Maslennikov, and commander of the deployed submarine detachment Vasily Arkhipov, who was equal in rank to Savitsky but the senior officer aboard B-59, were only authorized to launch the torpedo if they unanimously agreed to do so. B-59 was the only sub in the flotilla that required three officers' authorization in order to fire the "special weapon"; the other three subs only required the captain and the political officer to approve the launch, but, due to Arkhipov's position as detachment commander, B-59'''s captain and political officer also required his approval. Arkhipov alone opposed the launch, and eventually he persuaded Savitsky to surface and await orders from Moscow.

As the submarine's batteries had run very low and its air-conditioning had failed, B-59 had to surface. It surfaced amid the US warships pursuing it and made contact with the US destroyer USS Cory. After discussions with the ship, B-59 was then ordered by the Russian fleet to set course back to the Soviet Union.

 See also 
 Vasily Arkhipov

 Notes 

 References 
 
 Polmar, Norman, Cold War Submarines, The Design and Construction of U.S. and Soviet Submarines. KJ More. Potomac Books, Inc., 2003. 
 
 "Cuban Missile Crisis: The Man Who Saved the World", Secrets of the Dead, PBS TV documentary, October 24, 2012
 William Burr and Thomas S. Blanton, editors (October 31, 2002) "The Submarines of October. U.S. and Soviet Naval Encounters During the Cuban Missile Crisis", National Security Archive Electronic Briefing Book No. 75
 Ketov, Ryurik A. "The Cuban Missile Crisis as seen through a periscope." Journal of Strategic Studies'' 28.2 (2005): 217-231. 

Foxtrot-class submarines
Cuban Missile Crisis
Ships built in the Soviet Union
1960 ships
Cold War submarines of the Soviet Union